

2013 CAF Champions league

Group stage

Group A

Semifinals

2–2 on aggregate. Al-Ahly won the penalty shoot-out and advanced to the final.

Final

FIFA Club World Cup

All times Western European Time (UTC±0).

Quarter-finals

Fifth-place match

Egyptian Premier League

Group 1

Championship play-off

2014 CAF Super Cup

2014 CAF Champions League

Round of 32

1–1 on aggregate. Al-Ahly won the penalty shoot-out and advanced to the second round.

Round of 16 

Al-Ahly Benghazi won 4–2 on aggregate and advanced to the group stage. Al-Ahly entered the play-off round.

2014 CAF Confederation Cup

Play-off Round 

2–2 on aggregate. Al-Ahly won on the away goals rule and advanced to the group stage.

Group stage

Group B

Note: Al Ahly's season end in beginning of July, so the rest of the 2014 CAF Confederation Cup group stage matches will be included in the next season, as the competition will be resumed by the end of July, after the end of 2014 FIFA World Cup

2014 Egypt Cup

Round of 16

Quarter-final

Semi-final

References

Al Ahly SC seasons
Al-Ahly